Eleftheria Athletic Center (Greek: Αθλητικό Κέντρο "Ελευθερία"), officially named Tassos Papadopoulos Eleftheria Indoor Hall is an indoor arena that is located besides Makario Stadium and Lefkotheo Indoor Hall in Engomi, Nicosia, Cyprus.

The hall is mainly used for basketball events, although it can also be used for badminton, gymnastics, karate, taekwondo, handball, squash, volleyball, judo, futsal and table tennis. It is sometimes also used for national celebrations, for the declaration of the new President of Cyprus, and for musical concerts. 

The arena is named after Tassos Papadopoulos, the fifth President of the Republic of Cyprus, who was in office from February 28, 2003, to February 28, 2008. Currently, the arena has a capacity of around 6,800 seats, and it is the biggest indoor sports hall on the island of Cyprus.

History
Eleftheria was built in 1993. It is the home venue of AC Omonia Nicosia BC, ETHA Engomis, and the senior men's Cypriot national basketball team. It has hosted several great basketball and other sports competitions, and also some cultural competitions. 

The most important was Miss Universe 2000, where Lara Dutta of India, won the title, and was awarded as Miss Universe 2000. 79 delegates competed for the crown. The European Saporta Cup final of 1996–97, between Real Madrid and Verona, where Real Madrid won the trophy, and the FIBA EuroCup All-Star Day in 2005, were also held in the arena. 

It has also hosted some Cypriot Basketball League Finals and Cypriot Cup Finals. On 25th of October 2013, it hosted the first ever EuroLeague game held in Cyprus. For the second game of the 2013–14 Euroleague's regular season group stage, Panathinaikos played against Laboral Kutxa, in a game in which Panathinaikos won by a score of 95-74. The attendance for the game was 6,200.

See also
 Makario Stadium
 Lefkotheo

References

External links
 Eleftheria Indoor Hall by Omonia web site

Indoor arenas in Cyprus
Music venues in Cyprus
Sport in Nicosia
Buildings and structures in Nicosia
Basketball venues in Cyprus
Handball venues in Cyprus
Volleyball venues in Cyprus